McCoury is a surname. Notable people with the surname include:

Del McCoury (born 1939), American musician and singer
Rob McCoury, American bluegrass musician
Ronnie McCoury (born 1967), American musician, singer, and songwriter

See also
McCourt
McCourty